The year 1702 in architecture involved some significant events.

Buildings and structures

Buildings
 In London, Buckingham Palace is built as the London home of the Duke of Buckingham.
 In Addiscombe, near London, Addiscombe Place is built to the design of architect Sir John Vanbrugh (known for Blenheim Palace).
 In Bhaktapur, Nepal, the Nayatpola Temple, a five-story pagoda, is built at about this date by King Bhupatindra Malla.
 In Copenhagen, Gyldenløve's Mansion is erected by master builder Ernst Brandenburger.
 In Pennsylvania (colony), the Thompson-Neely House is built.
 In Romania, the Serbian Church in Arad is completed.
 In Italy the church of Sant'Antonio, Faenza is rebuilt to the design of Carlo Cesare Scaletta.
 In Rome, the façade of the church of Santa Maria in Trastevere is reconstructed by Carlo Fontana.
 In Germany, the tower of St. Thomas Church, Leipzig, is reconstructed.
 In South Korea, the Gakhwangjeon Hall is completed to a design by a team of Buddhist monks led by Neungo.

Births
 February 3 – Giovanni Battista Vaccarini, Sicilian architect (died 1768)
 February 10 – Carlo Marchionni, Roman architect (died 1786)

Deaths
 May 10 – Antonio Gherardi, Italian painter, sculptor and architect working in Rome (born 1638)

architecture
Years in architecture
18th-century architecture